Simulator may refer to:

 Flight simulator, a working mockup of an aircraft cockpit, automated to give an approximation of the experience of flying the plane
 Combat flight simulation game, a video game that simulates military aircraft in combat 
 Driving simulator, a simulator of the driving of cars and other ground vehicles
 Motion simulator an amusement ride system paired with a ride film, commonly used for entertainment in theme parks
 Quantum simulator, a simulator of quantum systems
 Simulation video game, any of a class of video games that aims to simulate something else, such as a billiards table, pinball machine, or (see above) aircraft flight controls
 Simulator ride, an amusement ride in which an audience watches a film while the ride's movement and practical effects produce an immersive environment
 Space simulator, a system that simulates an environment in outer space
 Train simulator, a railway simulator used for training or amusement

See also
 
 Simulation (disambiguation)
 Simulator sickness